Halima Kanni (born 14 March 1964) is a Tunisia politician for the Ennahda party. She was elected to represent part of Tunis in 2011.

Life
Kanni was born in Grombalia in 1964. She was awarded a scientific baccalaureate in 1983. She continued studying medicine in Tunis completing an internship in France.

She represented the Islamist party Ennahda in the elections in Tunisia for the second district of Tunis. She was elected to the Constituent Assembly on 23 October 2011. She served on the regional and local public authorities board and the infrastructure and environment committee.

In 2012, she caused discord with the media when she accused them of a lack of patriotism and for being under foreign influences. In this regard she cited the French ambassador. The press left the building in protest and the parliamentary leader of Ennahda, Sahbi Atig, disassociated his party from Kanni's accusations.

References

1964 births
Living people
21st-century Tunisian women politicians
21st-century Tunisian politicians
People from Nabeul Governorate
Ennahda politicians
Members of the Constituent Assembly of Tunisia